The Bethesda Big Train is a collegiate summer baseball team based in Bethesda, Maryland. The team is a member of the Cal Ripken Collegiate Baseball League (CRCBL), and derives its name from the nickname of Hall of Fame pitcher Walter Johnson, who was a Bethesda resident for ten years. The Big Train plays its home games at Shirley Povich Field. As of August 2021, more than 195 Big Train alumni have played professional baseball, including 17 in the major leagues.

History

The Bethesda Community Baseball Club, Inc. was founded in 1998 "to raise funds to improve the quality of youth baseball and softball fields in Montgomery County and the District of Columbia." Proceeds from the operations of the Bethesda Big Train are used to further this mission.

The Big Train commenced play in 1999 as part of the Clark Griffith Collegiate Baseball League (CGL). In 2004, they won the CGL championship.

In 2005, the Big Train joined the Cal Ripken Collegiate Baseball League (CRCBL). That first year, the team won the regular season  championship and shared the league championship with the Silver Spring-Takoma Thunderbolts. In 2006 the Big Train were the regular season champions. In 2009, the Big Train won both the regular season and league championships. In 2010, the Big Train captured their 2nd straight league championship after placing 3rd in the regular season, and in 2011 rolled to their 3rd consecutive league championship with a 36–9 overall record and were ranked the #1 summer collegiate baseball league team in the nation by Perfect Game USA.

In early 2012, the Bethesda Community Base Ball Club announced that Big Train operations would come under the control of one of its longtime partners, BCC Baseball.  In 2020, BCC Baseball decided to focus its business efforts on other aspects and the Bethesda Community Base Ball Club was reconstituted with a community-based Board of Directors to re-establish the management of Big Train operations.  The goal remained to support community-based activities in Montgomery County, Maryland and, to the extent that funds could be generated in excess of operating costs, to provide financial support for fixing up ballfields in Montgomery County

In 2016, after a four-year title drought, Big Train captured the Cal Ripken League championship with a victory over the Baltimore Redbirds. The next year, Big Train again defeated the Redbirds in the finals to win back-to-back league championships. That season, Big Train outfielder James Outman was named the 2017 National Summer Collegiate Player of the Year by Perfect Game after hitting .341 with 18 stolen bases and a league-best nine homers and 36 RBIs.

The Big Train and Redbirds were named co-champions in 2018 due to inclement weather, and Big Train won their fourth straight league title in 2019 after defeating the Silver Spring-Takoma Thunderbolts in a three-game League Championship Series.

Bethesda's 2020 season was cancelled due to the COVID-19 pandemic.

In 2021, the Big Train won their fourth straight regular season title, seven games ahead of the number two seed Alexandria Aces. In the playoffs, the Big Train swept the DC Grays in two games of the Semifinal Series, and then won their fifth straight league title by sweeping the Alexandria Aces in two games during the League Championship Series.

In 2022, the Big Train tied the Alexandria Aces for first place in the regular season. However, the Aces won the head-to-head tiebreaker with a record of 4-2 against the Big Train, which stripped the Big Train of the regular season title for the first time since 2016. In the playoffs, the Big Train swept the Gaithersburg Giants in two games of the Semifinal Series, however the Aces then swept the Big Train in the League Championship Series for the Aces' first ever Ripken League Championship title. This was the first time the Big Train lost the League Championship Series since 2015.

In addition to on-field efforts, Big Train runs a summer camp for children ages 5–12.

Team records

Individual (single-season) 

 Batting average: .441, Kobe Kato (2019)
 Hits: 67, Adam Barry (2011)
 Doubles: 17, Brendan Hendriks (2012)
 Triples: 6, Ryan Collins (2010)
 Home runs: 16, Hunter Renfroe (2012)
 Total bases: 116, Hunter Renfroe (2012)
 Runs batted in: 53, Hunter Renfroe (2012)
 Runs scored: 47, Hunter Renfroe (2012)
 Stolen bases: 39, Gio Diaz (2019)
 Walks: 48, Kobe Kato (2019)
 Hit by pitch: 21, Jarrod Parks (2009)
 On-base percentage: .612, Kobe Kato (2019)
 Slugging percentage: .866, Hunter Renfroe (2012)
 OPS: 1.397, Hunter Renfroe (2012)
 ERA: 0.00, Matt Hiserman (2008)
 Batting average against: 0.148, Matt Hiserman (2008)
 Innings pitched: 58.0, Dustin Pease (2005)
 Strikeouts: 69, Dirk Hayhurst (2001)
 Wins: 6, Scott Schneider (2008) and Cameron Love (2009)
 Saves: 10, Justin Davis (2000) and Matt Hiserman (2008)

Notable alumni

Cal Ripken Collegiate Baseball League 

Alec Burleson, 2018 Big Train - outfielder for St. Louis Cardinals
Hunter Brown, 2018 Big Train - right-handed pitcher for Houston Astros
Ken Waldichuk, 2017 Big Train - left-handed pitcher for Oakland Athletics
Logan Gilbert, 2016 Big Train – right-handed pitcher for Seattle Mariners; 14th overall pick in 2018 MLB Draft
David McKay, 2015 Big Train – right-handed pitcher for the Seattle Mariners and Detroit Tigers
Brandon Lowe, 2014 Big Train – Tampa Bay Rays second baseman; 2017 Florida State League MVP
Ty France, 2013 Big Train – infielder for San Diego Padres and Seattle Mariners; 2022 American League All-Star.
Hunter Renfroe, 2011–12 Big Train – right fielder for San Diego Padres, Tampa Bay Rays, Boston Red Sox, and Milwaukee Brewers; 13th overall pick in 2013 MLB Draft; first player to have his number retired by Big Train in the Cal Ripken Collegiate Baseball League; owns several single-season franchise records, including home runs, RBI and slugging percentage
Ryan Garton, 2011 Big Train – right-handed pitcher for the Seattle Mariners and Tampa Bay Rays
Matt Bowman, 2010-12 Big Train – right-handed pitcher for the Cincinnati Reds and St. Louis Cardinals
Cody Allen, 2008, 2010 Big Train – right-handed pitcher for the Los Angeles Angels and Cleveland Indians; all-time Indians saves leader
Joe Mantiply, 2010 Big Train – left-handed pitcher for the Detroit Tigers, New York Yankees, and Arizona Diamondbacks;  2022 National League All-Star.
Brian Dozier, 2006 Big Train – second baseman for New York Mets, Washington Nationals, Los Angeles Dodgers and Minnesota Twins; 2015 American League All-Star; 2017 AL Gold Glove

Clark Griffith Collegiate Baseball League 

Michael McKenry, 2004 Big Train – Pittsburgh Pirates, Colorado Rockies and St. Louis Cardinals catcher.
Mike Costanzo, 2003 Big Train – Cincinnati Reds first baseman
Bobby Livingston, 2001 Big Train – left-handed pitcher for the Cincinnati Reds and Seattle Mariners.
Dirk Hayhurst, 2001 Big Train – right-handed pitcher for the San Diego Padres and Toronto Blue Jays.
Steve Schmoll, 2000 Big Train – right-handed pitcher for the Los Angeles Dodgers.
John Maine, 2000 Big Train – right-handed pitcher for the Baltimore Orioles, New York Mets and Miami Marlins.
Charlton Jimerson, 1999 Big Train, outfielder for the Houston Astros and Seattle Mariners.

Additional Background 

In 2006, Washington Post columnist Marc Fisher called Big Train games at Shirley Povich Field "the ultimate small-town fantasy."

In 2018, on the occasion of the 20th Big Train season, the Big Train Souvenir Program contained an article with the title "Everything You Always Wanted to Know About the Big Train."  The article was written in the format of 20 questions and answers.  Those questions and answers are on display on the Big Train website.

References

External links
Bethesda Big Train Official Website
Cal Ripken, Sr. Collegiate Baseball League Official Website
Clark Griffith League Official Website

1998 establishments in Maryland
Baseball teams established in 1998
Amateur baseball teams in Maryland
Fan-owned baseball teams
Bethesda, Maryland